Bailleul  may refer to:

France 

Bailleul, Nord, in the Nord département
Bailleul, Orne, in the Orne département
Bailleul, Somme, in the Somme département
Bailleul-aux-Cornailles, in the Pas-de-Calais département
Bailleul-la-Vallée, in the Eure département
Bailleul-le-Soc, in the Oise département
Bailleul-lès-Pernes, in the Pas-de-Calais département
Bailleul-Neuville, in the Seine-Maritime département
Bailleul-Sir-Berthoult, in the Pas-de-Calais département
Bailleul-sur-Thérain, in the Oise département

Belgium
, part of the municipality of Estaimpuis